Jesper Modin, born June 4, 1988 in Selånger, Sweden is a Swedish cross-country skier who has competed at international top level since 2005. During the 2010 Winter Olympics in Vancouver, he finished 18th in the individual sprint event.

His best World Cup competition finish was third at a sprint event in Rogla, Slovenia in December 2009.

On 7 April 2016 his retirement from cross-country skiing was announced.

Cross-country skiing results
All results are sourced from the International Ski Federation (FIS).

Olympic Games

World Championships

World Cup

Season standings

Individual podiums
1 podium

Team podiums

 1 victory – (1 ) 
 2 podiums – (2 )

References

External links
 
 Official website 

1988 births
Living people
People from Sundsvall Municipality
Cross-country skiers from Västernorrland County
Cross-country skiers at the 2010 Winter Olympics
Olympic cross-country skiers of Sweden
Swedish male cross-country skiers
Piteå Elit skiers